Ramakrishna Mission Vidyalaya, Narendrapur is a unit of Ramakrishna Mission Ashrama, Narendrapur, which is a branch of Ramakrishna Mission with headquarters at Belur. It is affiliated to the West Bengal Council of Higher Secondary Education and West Bengal Board of Secondary Education, having both Bengali and English Medium.

Notable alumni
 Alapan Bandyopadhyay
 Kaushik Ganguly
 Bibek Debroy
 Bimal Kumar Roy
 Purnendu Chatterjee
 Mukut Mithi
 Chandril Bhattacharya
 

Any change in the following list is tracked by Wikipedia moderators. Any violation or misinformation will lead to serious hamper to the editor.

See also
 Ramakrishna Mission Residential College

References

External links
  

Boarding schools in West Bengal
Schools affiliated with the Ramakrishna Mission
Schools in South 24 Parganas district
1958 establishments in West Bengal